The 1920 Florida gubernatorial election was held on November 2, 1920. Democratic nominee Cary A. Hardee defeated Republican nominee George E. Gay with 77.94% of the vote.

Primary elections
Primary elections were held on June 8, 1920.

Democratic primary

Candidates
Cary A. Hardee, former Speaker of the Florida House of Representatives
Van C. Swearingen, Florida Attorney General
Lincoln Hulley, State senator

Results

General election

Candidates
Major party candidates
Cary A. Hardee, Democratic
George E. Gay, Republican 

Other candidates
Furman C. Whitaker, Socialist, doctor and Socialist Party candidate in 1904 for the Manatee County School District.
W.L. VanDuzer, Independent

Results

County Results

References

1920
Florida
Gubernatorial